The Unity Building, in Oregon, Illinois, is a historic building in that city's Oregon Commercial Historic District. As part of the district the Oregon Unity Building has been listed on the National Register of Historic Places, along with the rest of the district, since August 2006.

Notes

Buildings and structures in Oregon Commercial Historic District
Historic district contributing properties in Illinois
Commercial buildings on the National Register of Historic Places in Illinois